Camponotus mitis is a species of carpenter ant (genus Camponotus). It is found from India, Sri Lanka, and China.

References

External links

 at antwiki.org
Itis.gov
Animaldiversity.org

mitis
Hymenoptera of Asia
Insects described in 1858